Claire Lucille Parkinson  is an American Earth scientist and climatologist at NASA's Goddard Space Flight Center.

Education 
Parkinson has a B.A. in mathematics from Wellesley College, where she was elected to both Phi Beta Kappa and Sigma Xi, and a Ph.D. in geography/climatology from Ohio State University.

Career 
Parkinson is a climatologist at NASA's Goddard Space Flight Center. Her research emphasis has been on polar sea ice and its connections to the rest of the climate system and to climate change, with a particular emphasis on satellite remote sensing. This work has involved satellite data set generation and analysis, including the determination of decreases in Arctic sea ice coverage since the 1970s and examination of their regional and interannual variabilities and impacts, plus the quantification and analysis of the very different time series of sea ice changes in the Antarctic. Dr. Parkinson is the Project Scientist for the Aqua satellite mission, which launched in May 2002 and continues to transmit data on many atmospheric, ocean, land, and ice variables. The Aqua data have been used in thousands of research publications by scientists worldwide and in numerous practical applications, including weather forecasting and forest fire detection.

Parkinson has developed a computer model of sea ice, has done field work in both the Arctic and the Antarctic.  She has authored more than 100 scientific publications and author or editor of 15 books, among them she is the lead author of an atlas of Arctic sea ice from satellite data and a coauthor of two other sea ice atlases. She wrote an introductory book on examining the Earth with satellite imagery, has coauthored a university textbook on climate modeling, has coedited two books on satellite observations related to global change, and is lead editor of the 2000 Earth Observing System Data Products Handbook, Vol. 2 and of the 2006 NASA Earth Science Reference Handbook. In 2010 she published a book titled "Coming Climate Crisis? Consider the Past, Beware the Big Fix" about climate change and her concerns regarding potentially dangerous proposed geoengineering projects. She has done considerable outreach to children and the general public, serving as the sole science advisor to the photographic exhibit “Antarctica On Thin Ice” that opened at the United Nations Headquarters in New York City on December 17, 2007.  She is  active in promoting women in science, including leading an effort that produced a book on Women of Goddard: Careers in Science, Technology, Engineering, and Mathematics and a set of six related posters. Parkinson is also interested in history, and has written a book on the history of western science from 1202 to 1930, "Breakthroughs: A Chronology of Great Achievements in Science and Mathematics," published by G. K. Hall, Boston in 1985.

Honors and awards 
 2000	Fellow, American Meteorological Society
 2001	NASA Exceptional Service Medal 
 2003	Aviation Week & Space Technology Laurels Award for Outstanding Achievement in the Field of Space 
 2003	NASA Outstanding Leadership Medal 
 2004	Richard P. Goldthwait Polar Medal 
 2006	American Institute of Aeronautics and Astronautics Space Systems Award
 2008	NASA Exceptional Achievement Medal
 2009	Election to the U.S. National Academy of Engineering
 2010	Election to the American Philosophical Society
 2010	Fellow, American Association for the Advancement of Science
 2011	American Meteorological Society Remote Sensing Prize
 2015	William Nordberg Memorial Award for Earth Science, NASA Goddard Space Flight Center
 2016	Election to the U.S. National Academy of Sciences
 2016	Fellow, American Geophysical Union
 2017	NASA Silver Achievement Medal, FEMA response volunteers
 2018	Fellow, American Academy of Arts and Sciences
 2020 Samuel J. Heyman Service to America Medal
 2020 Maryland Women's Hall of Fame
 2020 Roger Revelle Medal

References 

Living people
People from Long Island
American earth scientists
Wellesley College alumni
Ohio State University alumni
American women scientists
Members of the United States National Academy of Sciences
Year of birth missing (living people)
21st-century American women